Randall Charles Dixon (born March 12, 1965) is a former American college and professional football player who was a tackle in the National Football League (NFL) for nine seasons during the 1980s and 1990s. Dixon played college football for the University of Pittsburgh, and thereafter played professionally for the Indianapolis Colts of the NFL.

1965 births
Living people
People from Clewiston, Florida
Players of American football from Florida
American football offensive linemen
Pittsburgh Panthers football players
All-American college football players
Indianapolis Colts players